The Northeast Conference baseball tournament is the conference baseball championship of the NCAA Division I Northeast Conference.  The top four finishers in the regular season of the conference's seven teams advance to the double elimination tournament.  The winner of the tournament receives an automatic berth to the NCAA Division I Baseball Championship.

Champions

By year
The following is a list of conference champions and sites listed by year.

By school
The following is a list of conference champions listed by school. Schools in italics no longer field baseball teams in the NEC.

References